Kuwait is one of a hundred countries that have submitted films for the Academy Award for Best International Feature Film. The Foreign Language Film award is handed out annually by the United States Academy of Motion Picture Arts and Sciences to a feature-length motion picture produced outside the United States that contains primarily non-English dialogue.  Kuwait has submitted two films to the Oscars, most recently in 1978. Both films were dramas directed by Khalid Al-Siddiq. Neither received an Oscar nomination.

Submissions
The Academy of Motion Picture Arts and Sciences has invited the film industries of various countries to submit their best film for the Academy Award for Best Foreign Language Film since 1956. The Foreign Language Film Award Committee oversees the process and reviews all the submitted films. Following this, they vote via secret ballot to determine the five nominees for the award. Below is a list of the films that have been submitted by Kuwait for review by the Academy for the award by year and the respective Academy Awards ceremony.

The Cruel Sea is the first feature film ever to be made in one of the GCC countries  and Kuwait became the first GCC nation to submit a movie to the Academy Awards, in 1972. The Cruel Sea played at the Venice Film Festival and concerns the story of a young man from a poor, pearl diving family who loves a young woman from a merchant family who is betrothed to an elderly man. Six years later, Kuwait submitted The Wedding of Zein, about a pious village idiot who becomes the object of affection of a beautiful local girl. Since 1978, Kuwait has not submitted any more films in the best international film category, making its submission the oldest amongst other countries. Although Kuwait has submitted in other categories since then, in 2019 the short animated film Falafel Cart directed by Abdullah Al-Wazzan was submitted for the 92nd Academy Awards in the short animated film category making it Kuwait's first submission in any short film category and the third film overall to be submitted from Kuwait in any category.

See also

List of Academy Award winners and nominees for Best Foreign Language Film
List of Academy Award-winning foreign language films
Cinema of Kuwait

Notes

References

External links
The Official Academy Awards Database
The Motion Picture Credits Database
IMDb Academy Awards Page

Best Foreign Language Film Academy Award submissions by country
Academy Award for Best Foreign Language Film
Lists of films by country of production
Academy Award